The PNS Himalaya, formerly known as BINS Himalaya,  is the naval base and the home of the Pakistan Navy's only boot camp, commissioned in 1943. It is on Manora Island, Karachi. Till 1947 it was titled as BINS Himalaya as Pakistan was then part of British India. The base is named after the famous Himalaya Mountain Range.

History 
As a first step Marine Training Establishment (MTE) was created at Manora in 1948. The facility was upgraded as an independent unit in Dec 1950. Subsequently, a new establishment was considered for commissioning in an area where future expansion could take place.

Before 1971, All the training centers was in East Pakistan (now Bangladesh).

In 1971, The New Entry school was established in PNS Himalaya for Sailors Initial training or Boot camp.

Between 1971 to 1980, the following training schools were established in PNS Himalaya for the sailors of Pakistan Navy:

Navigation and Operations School

Surface Weapons School

Underwater Warfare School

Communications School

In 1981, On the commission of PNS Bahadur (Commissioned in 1980) all schools were shifted to PNS Bahadur.

On 14 April 1990, Pakistan Marine was recommissioned or recreated PNS Himalaya as the first headquarters of Pakistan Marines.

In 1994, Headquarters of the Pakistan Marines was relocated from the PNS Himalaya (Navy's only boot camp) to the Manora Fort in the PNS Qasim.

Currently, PNS Himalaya is the Initial Boot Camp of new enrolled sailor candidates in Pakistan Navy.

References

Pakistan Navy facilities
Pakistan Naval Air Stations
Pakistan Navy bases